Duvvada is a suburban area of Visakhapatnam city, under the Revenue Mandal of Gajuwaka in Greater Visakhapatnam Municipal Corporation.
A sub-post Office located at Duvvada with pincode 530046 and 530049

Etymology
The name Duvvada was earlier Dvivada, meaning 'Two Forts' or 'Town of Two forts'.

Transport
APSRTC buses are accessible from Dwaraka Bus Station are 38Y & 400K. And also buses are access from surrounding areas are Gajuwaka, Kurmannapalem, Visakhapatnam Steel Plant, Aganampudi, Vadlapudi etc.

APSRTC routes

By Rail

Duvvada railway station serves about 108,000 passengers on a daily basis. Many of trains always rush like Jhanmabhoomi express, Ratnachal express which are intercity service to other big cities like Secunderabad and Guntur.[4]

Features
QualityInn Ramachandra Hotels is located near Duvvada Railway Station, well suited for Business stays, Conference meetings and for value-adding Industrial visits to Vizag Steel Plant, APIIC SEZ.
Vignan College of Engineering and Technology is near to Duvvada railway station.
Gonna Institute of information technology (GIITS) is a nearby Engineering college (7 km from station) which offers B.tech and diploma courses
 There is a suburban railway station of Visakhapatnam in East Coast Railway, Indian Railways. 
 It has been developed as a satellite station for Visakhapatnam Railway Station, It has 4 platforms.
 long-distance trains also have halted at Duvvuda station.
 The Duvvuda Station is near to VSEZ Visakhapatnam Special Economic Zone and also to Vizag Steel Plant (RINL-VIZAG).
 Duvvada railway station is the first station of East Coast Railway

Gallery

References

Neighbourhoods in Visakhapatnam